The 2017 Minneapolis mayoral election was held on November 7, 2017, to elect the Mayor of Minneapolis. This was the third mayoral election in the city's history to use ranked-choice voting. Municipal elections in Minnesota are nonpartisan, although candidates were able to identify with a political party on the ballot.

No candidate achieved a majority in the first round of ballot counting on election night. Jacob Frey was declared the winner the next day after several rounds of vote tabulations.

Background

2013 election

Betsy Hodges was elected mayor of Minneapolis on November 5, 2013, out of a field of 35 candidates, with her term beginning on January 2, 2014. In response to the large candidate field, the Minneapolis Charter Commission approved a referendum increasing the filing fee from $20 to $500. The proposal was approved by voters on November 4, 2014.

Campaign
In a blog letter dated November 7, 2016, a housing activist and longtime Minneapolis resident known as Captain Jack Sparrow announced his candidacy for mayor in the 2017 election; this was his third election campaign for office in the past 6 years. Nekima Levy-Pounds, an attorney, civil rights activist, and former president of the Minneapolis NAACP, was one of the first candidates to begin their campaign, with an announcement on November 14, 2016. Hodges announced her re-election campaign on December 15, 2016. City Council member Jacob Frey and filmmaker Aswar Rahman entered in early January, while State Representative Raymond Dehn and theatre executive Tom Hoch announced their campaigns in February. David John Wilson, an active member of the Democratic Farmer-Labor (DFL) party, entered the race during the candidate filing period in August 2017, but he declined to identify by party affiliation in favor of the stated principle "Rainbows Butterflies Unicorns". Ian Simpson ran under the platform of the Idea Party, which asks the citizens of Minneapolis to pitch in their own creative solutions for change.

Formal candidate filing began on August 1, 2017. Political parties held caucuses and conventions in the spring and summer, deciding whether to endorse a candidate for election. The DFL did not endorse a Minneapolis mayoral candidate at its July 2017 convention.

On October 27, the Star Tribune editorial staff endorsed Jacob Frey for mayor. This was followed by an endorsement of Frey by the Minnesota Daily on October 30.

Candidates

Democratic-Farmer-Labor
 Raymond Dehn, State Representative (District 59B)
 Al Flowers, community activist
 Jacob Frey, City Council member (Third Ward)
 Tom Hoch, former president of the Hennepin Theatre Trust, former deputy executive director of the Minneapolis Public Housing Authority
 Betsy Hodges, incumbent mayor
 Nekima Levy-Pounds, civil rights activist, former president of the Minneapolis NAACP, founding director of the Community Justice Project at the University of St. Thomas law school
 Jeffrey Sterling Olson
  Aswar Rahman, filmmaker, businessman
 Suspended campaign on November 2, 2017, and subsequently endorsed Jacob Frey.
 Gregg Iverson, retired employee of Minnesota Department of Transportation

Independent 
 L.A. Nik,  Author and podcast host

Farmer Labor 
 Troy Benjegerdes

Basic Income Guarantee 
 Captain Jack Sparrow, urban housing and Occupy movement activist

Socialist Workers Party 
 David Rosenfeld

Libertarian 
 Charlie Gers

Rainbow, Butterflies, Unicorns 
 David John Wilson

The Idea Party 
 Ian Simpson

Gallery

 Not pictured:  Jeffrey Sterling Olson, David Rosenfeld  L.A. Nik

Results
No candidate achieved a majority in the first round on election night. Several rounds of vote transfers were necessary to determine a winner, a process which did not start until the next day.

Candidates whose total votes in all ranked positions are less than the highest votes in first rank are immediately eliminated. In 2017 five candidates remained for the sequential elimination process. 

With four rounds of elimination, Jacob Frey was announced as the winner on Wednesday, November 8, at 2 pm, 18 hours after the polls closed.

Source: Minneapolis Elections & Voter Services

See also
 Minneapolis City Council election, 2017
 Minneapolis municipal election, 2017

References

External links
 Minneapolis Elections & Voter Services

2017 Minnesota elections
Minneapolis
Local elections in Minnesota